Star Trek: The Next Generation Interactive VCR Board Game – A Klingon Challenge is a video board game created by Decipher, Inc., published by Milton Bradley in 1993. Based on the American science fiction television series Star Trek: The Next Generation, the game is set in the Star Trek universe, specifically on the USS Enterprise-D starship. The game utilizes a video tape that runs constantly while users play the board game portion. Events on the video tape combine with board game play to determine whether users win or lose the game. The video itself was directed by Les Landau and contains original footage filmed on the actual Star Trek: The Next Generation sets at Paramount Studios.

The Klingon character (Kavok) is played by actor Robert O'Reilly, who is famous for his role on the series as Gowron, chancellor of the Klingon High Council. Jonathan Frakes contributes to the game by reprising his role as William Riker and narrating the beginning of the videotape via log entry. This log entry sets the stage for the game play and subsequent events.

The game was originally released in 1993 with "limited edition" white box packaging but later releases had "general edition" black box packaging with updated graphics and flavor text.

The game takes about 1 hour to play and required a VCR with a television, while the players also have a board and must roll dice and draw cards.

Casting 
The game features video segments that are played at certain times, and these segments have actors playing Star Trek characters. This includes:
	
 Jonathan Frakes as William Riker narrates a voiceover log entry at the beginning of the game.
 Robert O’Reilly as Kavok

Plot
The USS Enterprise-D has docked at Starbase 74 to undergo repairs to a damaged computer core that has been causing low-level malfunctions. The ship is practically empty, because Captain Jean-Luc Picard has granted shore leave to all personnel. The only people on the ship are the Starbase engineering team (the players) assigned to repairs.

Before the repairs are complete, Kavok, a Klingon who believes the Federation–Klingon alliance has made the Klingon Empire weak, hijacks the Enterprise and sets a course for the Klingon homeworld (Qo'noS), where he plans on using the Enterprise to start a war between the two space-faring powers.

The objective of the game is to regain control of the Enterprise and stop Kavok's plan. To do so, players will need to secure access to five levels of the main computer, obtain a phaser from Security, and successfully crawl down a Jeffries tube to access the Bridge, all within the 60 minutes before the ship reaches the Klingon home world.

There are multiple events in the videotape which affect game play, and once the countdown clock hits 00:00, the ship reaches Qo'noS and is attacked by Klingon ships stationed there. The Enterprise manages to destroy one Bird of Prey before the Klingons hit the Enterprises nacelle, destroying Enterprise, igniting a war and ending the game in defeat.

Box contents and flavor text

Game box contents
1 60-minute VHS tape, 1 game board, 6 Tricorders, 6 phasers, 56 Computer Access cards, 12 Holodeck cards, 12 Klingon bIj cards, 6 male playing pieces, 6 female playing pieces, 6 plastic stands, 30 Isolinear chips, 6 Federation rank tokens, 4 Bridge tokens, 2 stasis fields, 1 die, 1 plastic spinner with base, 1 sticker sheet with 18 communicators, 36 Federation rank pins, 1 spinner sticker, and 4 Medals of Valor.

Reception 
The A.V. Club, notes that in the 1980s and 1990s, VCR based games came closer to offering audiences "immersive, interactive audio-visual experience" in a novel way. This title is noted for Robert O'Reilly playing a disgruntled Klingon that demands a response from players.

Rob Wieland of Game & Sundry, said its surreal to see Robert O'Reilly cast a Klingon other than Gowron in the video segments. They said its a "pretty basic board game" but called the video a "campy delight" for fans.

References

External links
 
 Review at RPG.net
 Did You Ever Take "A Klingon Challenge"? by Maria Jose and John Tenuto  May 17, 2016 

Board games introduced in 1993
Board games based on Star Trek
Cooperative board games
Decipher, Inc. games
Video board games
Television episodes directed by Les Landau
Star Trek: The Next Generation